Surinamese people or people of Surinamese descent who are famous or notable include:

Art

Visual arts 
Leo Glans (1911–1980)
Soeki Irodikromo (1945–2020)
Stuart Robles de Medina (1930–2006)
Gerrit Schouten (1779–1839)
Erwin de Vries (1929–2018)

Film 
Borger Breeveld (born 1944)
Kenneth Herdigein (born 1959)
Pim de la Parra (born 1940)
Jörgen Raymann (born 1966)
Katja Schuurman (born 1975)
Jimmy Smits (born 1955)

Music 

Afrojack (born 1987)
Kenny B (born 1961)
Humphrey Campbell (born 1958)
Ramdew Chaitoe (1942–1994)
Chuckie (born 1978)
Damaru (born 1986)
Sharon Doorson (born 1987)
Anita Doth (born 1971)
Benjamin Faya (born 1988/1989)
Lieve Hugo (1934–1975)
Ruth Jacott (born 1960) 
Denise Jannah (born 1956)
Conchita Leeflang
Jeangu Macrooy (born 1993)
CB Milton (born 1968)
Murth The Man-O-Script (born 1970)
Max Nijman (1941–2016)
Papa Touwtjie (1968–2005)
Lodewijk Parisius (1911–1963)
Raffaëla Paton (born 1983)
Rochelle Perts (born 1992)
Def Rhymz (born 1970)
Natalie La Rose (born 1988)
Sidney Samson (born 1981)
Birgit Schuurman (born 1977)
Milly Scott (born 1933)
Tony Scott (born 1971)
Eva Simons (born 1984)
Ray Slijngaard (born 1971)
Ronald Snijders (born 1951)
Sabrina Starke (born 1979)
Max Woiski, Jr. (1930–2011)
Max Woiski, Sr. (1911–1981)

Writing 
Clark Accord (1961–2011)
Karin Amatmoekrim (born 1977)
Bhai (1935–2018)
Eugène Drenthe (1925–2009)
Hans Faverey (1933–1990)
Lou Lichtveld (1903–1996)
Cynthia McLeod (born 1936)
Pim de la Parra (born 1940)
Astrid Roemer (1947)
Ronald Snijders (born 1951)
Henri Frans de Ziel (1916–1975)

Inventors
Jan Ernst Matzeliger (1852–1889)

Journalists 
Bram Behr (1951–1982)
Prem Radhakishun (born 1962)
Anil Ramdas (1958–2012)

Military 
Dési Bouterse (born 1945)
Abraham George Ellis (1846–1916)
Yngwe Elstak (1927–2010)
Wilfred Hawker (1955–1982)
Fred Ormskerk (1923–1980)
Hugo Rijhiner (1905–1991)

Politics 

Ashwin Adhin (born 1980) 
Jules Ajodhia (born 1945) 
Alice Amafo (born 1977)
Robert Ameerali (born 1961)
Henck Arron (1936–2000)
Evert Azimullah (born 1938)
Bram Behr (1951–1982)
Léon Bertrand (born 1951)
Dési Bouterse (born 1945)
Eddy Bruma (1925–2000)
Ronnie Brunswijk (born 1962)
Henk Chin A Sen (1934–1999)
Archibald Currie (1888–1986)
Fred Derby (1939–2001)
Abraham George Ellis (1846–1916)
Ivan Fernald (born 1955)
Johan Ferrier (1910–2010)
Kathleen Ferrier (born 1957)
Laetitia Griffith (born 1965)
Roy Ho Ten Soeng (born 1945)
Eddy Hoost (1934–1982)
Otto Huiswoud (1893–1961)
Tanja Jadnanansing (born 1967)
André Kamperveen (1924–1982)
Harry Kisoensingh (1954–2008)
Anton de Kom (1898–1945)
Johan Kraag (1913–1996)
Jagernath Lachmon (1916–2001)
Marie Levens (born 1950)
Julius Caesar de Miranda (1906–1956)
Fred Ramdat Misier (1926–2004)
Felipe Enrique Neri, Baron de Bastrop (1759–1827)
Johan Adolf Pengel (1916–1970)
Pretaap Radhakishun (1934–2001)
Patricia Remak (born 1965)
Chan Santokhi (born 1959)
Ram Sardjoe (born 1935)
Ramsewak Shankar (born 1937)
Jules Sedney (1922–2020)
Jennifer Simons (born 1953)
Sylvana Simons (born 1971)
Willy Soemita (born 1936)
Paul Somohardjo (born 1943)
Joyce Sylvester (born 1965)
Ronald Venetiaan (born 1936)
Franc Weerwind (born 1964)
Jules Wijdenbosch (born 1941)
Armand Zunder (born 1946)

Science
Graman Quassi (1692–1787), botanist

Sports 

Carolyn Adel (born 1978), swimmer
Tommy Asinga (born 1968), athlete
Ryan Babel (born 1986), football player
Kiran Badloe (born 1994), windsurfer
Gilbert Ballantine (born 1961), kickboxer
Ashwin Balrak (born 1975), kickboxer
Sigourney Bandjar (born 1984), football player
Timothy Beck (born 1977), athlete, bobsledder
Diego Biseswar (born 1988), football player 
Alex Blanchard (born 1958), boxer
Regi Blinker (born 1969), football player 
Kevin Bobson (born 1980), football player
Winston Bogarde (born 1970), football player
Remy Bonjasky (born 1976), kickboxer
Edson Braafheid (born 1983), football player
Jeffrey Bruma (born 1991), football player
Lucien Carbin (born 1952), kickboxer
Romeo Castelen (born 1983), football player
Henk ten Cate (born 1954), football player
Nelli Cooman (born 1964), athlete
Lloyd van Dams (born 1972), kickboxer 
Edgar Davids (born 1973), football player
Lorenzo Davids (born 1986), football player
Sergiño Dest (born 2000), football player
Virgil van Dijk (born 1991), football player
Mitchell Donald (born 1988), football player
Ryan Donk (born 1986), football player
Darl Douglas (born 1979), football player
Giovanni Drenthe (born 1990), football player
Royston Drenthe (born 1987), football player
Regian Eersel (born 1992), kickboxer
Eljero Elia (born 1987), football player
Dex Elmont (born 1984), judoka
Guillaume Elmont (born 1981), judoka
Ilonka Elmont (born 1974), kickboxer
Ricardo Elmont (1954–2013), judoka
Kurt Elshot (born 1977), football player
Francisco Elson (born 1976), basketball player
Urby Emanuelson (born 1986), football player
Orlando Engelaar (born 1979), football player
Wim Esajas (born 1935), athlete
Iwan Fränkel (born 1941), football player
Henk Fraser (born 1966), football player
Cerezo Fung a Wing (born 1983), football player
Leroy George (born 1987), football player
Rodney Glunder (born 1975), kickboxer
Ulrich van Gobbel (born 1971), football player
Jacqueline Goormachtigh (born 1970), athlete
Dean Gorré (born 1970), football player
Murthel Groenhart (born 1986), kickboxer
Martha Grossenbacher (born 1959), athlete
Ruud Gullit (born 1962), football player
Warner Hahn (born 1992), football player
Harald Hasselbach (born 1967), American football player
Jimmy Floyd Hasselbaink (born 1972), football player
Nigel Hasselbaink (born 1990), football player
Ivan Hippolyte (born 1964), kickboxer
Ernesto Hoost (born 1965), kickboxer
Kew Jaliens (born 1978), football player
Jerry de Jong (born 1964), football player
Nigel de Jong (born 1984), football player
Calvin Jong-a-Pin (born 1986), football player
André Kamperveen (1924–1982), football player
Ricardo Kishna (born 1995), football player
Patrick Kluivert (born 1976), football player
Ryan Koolwijk (born 1985), football player
Ludwig Kotzebue (born 1946), karateka
Ranomi Kromowidjojo (born 1990), swimmer
Kelvin Leerdam (born 1990), football player
Jeremain Lens (born 1987), football player
Frank Lobman (1953–2021), kickboxer
Ismael Londt (born 1986), kickboxer
Melvin Manhoef (born 1976), mixed martial artist and kickboxer
Henny Meijer (born 1962), football player
Mario Melchiot (born 1976), football player
Stanley Menzo (born 1963), football player
Humphrey Mijnals (1930–2019), football player
Luciano Narsingh (born 1990), football player
Anthony Nesty (born 1967), swimmer
Remie Olmberg (born 1950), football player
Gerold Pawirodikromo, born c. 1958), athlete
Marco Piqué (born 1980), kickboxer
Celeste Plak (born 1995), volleyball player
Don Diego Poeder (born 1972), boxer
Germaine de Randamie (born 1984), mixed martial artist and kickboxer
John Reeberg (born 1947), karateka
Michael Reiziger (born 1973), football player
Frank Rijkaard (born 1962), football player
Herman Rijkaard (born 1935), football player
Lucia Rijker (born 1967), boxer
Andy Ristie (born 1982), kickboxer
Otti Roethof (born 1950), karateka
Bryan Roy (born 1970), football player
Jairzinho Rozenstruik (born 1988), mixed martial artist and kickboxer
Urta Rozenstruik (born 1975), athlete, bobsledder
Jamile Samuel (born 1992), athlete
Clifton Sandvliet (born 1977), football player
Ruben Schaken (born 1982), football player
Gregory Sedoc (born 1981), athlete
Clarence Seedorf (born 1976), football player
Regillio Simons (born 1973), football player
Xavi Simons (born 2003), football player
Rayen Simson (born 1972), kickboxer
Andwelé Slory (born 1982), football player
Evander Sno (born 1987), football player 
Virgil Soeroredjo (born 1985), badminton player 
Erwin Sparendam (born 1934), football player
Tyrone Spong (born 1985), boxer and kickboxer
Jurgen Themen (born 1985), sprinter
Dwight Tiendalli (born 1985), football player
Regilio Tuur (born 1967), boxer
Gerald Vanenburg (born 1964), football player
Roy Vanenburg (born 1948), football player
John Veldman (born 1968), football player
Kenneth Vermeer (born 1986), football player
Marciano Vink (born 1970), football player 
Michel Vorm (born 1983), football player 
Ginty Vrede (1985–2008), kickboxer
Mitchell te Vrede (born 1991), football player
Mark de Vries (born 1975), football player
Letitia Vriesde (born 1964), athlete
Boy Waterman (born 1984), football player
Kevin Wattamaleo (born 1989), football player
Lorenzo Wiebers (born 1986), football player
Georginio Wijnaldum (born 1990), football player
Jason Wilnis (born 1990), kickboxer
Aron Winter (born 1967), football player
Donovan Wisse (born 1997), kickboxer
Mitchel Wongsodikromo (born 1985), badminton player
Gilbert Yvel (born 1976), mixed martial artist
Romeo Zondervan (born 1959), footballer

References